The Arecibo Observatory, also known as the National Astronomy and Ionosphere Center (NAIC) and formerly known as the Arecibo Ionosphere Observatory, is an observatory in Barrio Esperanza, Arecibo, Puerto Rico owned by the US National Science Foundation (NSF).

Completed in 1963, it was the world's largest single-aperture telescope for 53 years, surpassed in July 2016 by the Five-hundred-meter Aperture Spherical Telescope (FAST) in China. Following two breaks in cables supporting the receiver platform in mid-2020, the NSF decommissioned the telescope. A partial collapse of the telescope occurred on December 1, 2020, before controlled demolition could be conducted. In 2022, the NSF announced the telescope will not be rebuilt, with an educational facility to be established on the site.

The observatory also includes a smaller radio telescope, a LIDAR facility, and a visitor center, which remained operational after the telescope's collapse. The asteroid 4337 Arecibo is named after the observatory by Steven J. Ostro, in recognition of the observatory's contributions to the characterization of Solar System bodies.

History

As part of the United States Department of Defense (DoD) Advanced Research Projects Agency (ARPA) missile defense program, ARPA had sought a means to try to detect incoming missiles while they traveled through the ionosphere. The Arecibo Telescope was funded as a means to study Earth's ionosphere for this purpose, and serving a dual-use as a general-purpose radio telescope. Construction of the telescope and its supporting facilities were started in mid-1950s, with the telescope operational by 1963. The telescope and supporting observatory were formally opened as the Arecibo Ionospheric Observatory on November 1, 1963.

Ownership of the observatory transferred from the DoD to the National Science Foundation on October 1, 1969. NSF named Cornell University to manage the observatory's functions. By September 1971, NSF renamed the observatory as the National Astronomy and Ionosphere Center (NAIC) and had made it a federally funded research and development center (FFRDC). NASA began contributing towards funding of the observatory alongside NSF as to support its planetary radar mission.

In the early 2000s, NASA started to reduce their contribution to the Arecibo Observatory, putting more pressure on NSF to continue to fund the facility.  In 2006, NSF made its first possible suggestion of significantly reducing its funding towards Arecibo and potentially decommissioning the observatory. Academics and politicians lobbied to increase funding bookmarked for Arecibo to stave off its closure, and NASA recommitted funding in 2011 for study of near-earth objects. However to further cut losses, in 2011 NSF delisted Arecibo as a FFRDC, removed Cornell as the site operator, and replaced them with a collaborative team led by SRI International, which allowed the observatory to be able to offer its facilities to a wider range of projects. 

Damage to the telescope from Hurricane Maria in 2017 led NSF again to consider the possibility of decommissioning the observatory as the costs of maintaining it had become too great. A consortium led by the University of Central Florida (UCF) stepped forward to offer to manage the observatory and cover a significant portion of the operations and maintenance costs, and in 2018, NSF made UCF's consortium the new site operators.

After an auxiliary and main cable failure on the telescope in August and November 2020, respectively, the NSF announced the decision that they would decommission the telescope through controlled demolition, but that the other facilities on the observatory would remain operational in the future. However, before the safe decommission of the telescope could occur, remaining support cables from one tower rapidly failed in the morning of December 1, 2020, causing the instrument platform to crash through the dish, shearing off the tops of the support towers, and partially damaging some of the other buildings, though there were no injuries. NSF stated in 2020 that it is still their intention to continue to have the other observatory facilities operational as soon as possible and are looking at plans to rebuild a new telescope instrument in its place.  In 2022, the NSF announced the telescope will not be rebuilt, with an educational facility to be established on the site.

Facilities

Arecibo Telescope

The observatory's main feature was its large radio telescope, whose main collecting dish was an inverted spherical dome  in diameter with an  radius of curvature, constructed inside a karst sinkhole. The ground beneath supported shade-tolerant vegetation.

Since its completion in November 1963, the Telescope had been used for radar astronomy and radio astronomy, and had been part of the Search for extraterrestrial intelligence (SETI) program. It was also used by NASA for Near-Earth object detection. Since around 2006, NSF funding support for the telescope had waned as the Foundation directed funds to newer instruments, though academics petitioned to the NSF and Congress to continue support for the telescope. Numerous hurricanes, including Hurricane Maria, had damaged parts of the telescope, straining the reduced budget.

Two cable breaks, one in August 2020 and a second in November 2020, threatened the structural integrity of the support structure for the suspended platform and damaged the dish. The NSF determined in November 2020 that it was safer to decommission the telescope rather than to try to repair it, but the telescope collapsed before a controlled demolition could be carried out. The remaining support cables from one tower failed around 7:56 a.m. local time on December 1, 2020, causing the receiver platform to fall into the dish and collapsing the telescope.

NASA led an extensive failure investigation and reported the findings, along with a technical bulletin with industry recommendations.

Additional telescopes
The Arecibo Observatory also has other facilities beyond the main telescope, including a  radio telescope intended for very-long-baseline interferometry (VLBI) with the main telescope; and a LIDAR facility whose research has continued since the main telescope's collapse.

Ángel Ramos Foundation Visitor Center 

Opened in 1997, the Ángel Ramos Foundation Visitor Center features interactive exhibits and displays about the operations of the radio telescope, astronomy and atmospheric sciences. The center is named after the financial foundation that honors Ángel Ramos, owner of the El Mundo newspaper and founder of Telemundo. The Foundation provided half of the funds to build the Visitor Center, with the remainder received from private donations and Cornell University.

The center, in collaboration with the Caribbean Astronomical Society, hosts a series of Astronomical Nights throughout the year, which feature diverse discussions regarding exoplanets, astronomical phenomena, and discoveries (such as Comet ISON). The purposes of the center are to increase public interest in astronomy, the observatory's research successes, and space endeavors.

List of directors 
Source(s):

 1960–1965: William E. Gordon
 1965–1966: John W. Findlay
 1966–1968: Frank Drake
 1968–1971: Gordon Pettengill
 1971–1973: Tor Hagfors
 1973–1982: Harold D. Craft Jr.
 1982–1987: Donald B. Campbell
 1987–1988: Riccardo Giovanelli
 1988–1992: Michael M. Davis
 1992–2003: Daniel R. Altschuler
 2003–2006: Sixto A. González
 2006–2007: Timothy H. Hankins
 2007–2008: Robert B. Kerr
 2008–2011: Michael C. Nolan
 2011–2015: Robert B. Kerr
 2016–2022: Francisco Córdova
 2022–present: Olga Figueroa

See also 

 Air Force Research Laboratory (US)
 Atacama Large Millimeter Array (Chile)
 Five-hundred-meter Aperture Spherical Telescope (China)
 List of radio telescopes
 RATAN-600 (Russia)
 UPRM Planetarium, projection room in the University of Puerto Rico

References

Further reading 

 
 
 
 
 
 
Entry into the National Register of Historic Places
 
 
https://blogs.iu.edu/sciu/2021/07/03/arecibos-50-years-of-discoveries/

External links 

 

1963 establishments in Puerto Rico
Astronomical observatories in Puerto Rico
Government buildings completed in 1963
Historic districts on the National Register of Historic Places in Puerto Rico
Historic Mechanical Engineering Landmarks
Museums in Arecibo, Puerto Rico
National Science Foundation
Radio telescopes
Science museums in Puerto Rico
Search for extraterrestrial intelligence
University museums in Puerto Rico
Advanced Research Projects Agency
National Register of Historic Places in Arecibo, Puerto Rico
Buildings and structures on the National Register of Historic Places in Puerto Rico